Maxene Sofia Maria Arroyo Magalona (born November 23, 1986) is a Filipino actress, model, host and yoga instructor currently signed under ABS-CBN. Being a former GMA talent under the GMA Artist Center, she was known for her portrayal as Vivian Salvador in the My Lover, My Wife and Donna Vallejo on Daddy Di Do Du. Under ABS-CBN, she is best known for her portrayal as Alex Acosta on Doble Kara.

Early life
Magalona was born in Bacolod City, Negros Occidental Province, Philippines. Her father is the late Filipino rapper Francis Magalona and her grandparents are the late actors Pancho Magalona and Tita Duran. Pia Arroyo-Magalona is her mother and her sister is Saab who also joined showbiz in 2007, and her younger brother Elmo Magalona also joined showbiz three years later in Party Pilipinas, Pilyang Kerubin and also in Kaya ng Powers. She is also the niece, of second degree, to singer Regine Velasquez. She graduated from the Ateneo de Manila University in March 2010 with a Social Sciences bachelor's degree, although she didn't attend the graduation ceremonies due to personal reasons.

Career

Starting career on ABS-CBN
Her first show as a child was the ABS-CBN kiddie show Ang TV followed by 5 and Up.

GMA Network (1998–2014)
Then in 1998, she transferred to GMA Network. she made her first appearance in Munting Anghel in 2000. Then 2001 second appearance in Daddy Di Do Du in which she worked with Vic Sotto. In 2004, the role of Alwina in Mulawin was originally given to her, but she had to turn down the offer as she was about to start college at the time. It was later given to Angel Locsin. To date, her biggest break on television is when she was chosen to be one of Richard Gutierrez's leading ladies in major lead role Kamandag this is marks first primetime drama series on GMA Network. After Kamandag, Maxene played Jessa, originally played by Sharon Cuneta, in Sine Novela: Una Kang Naging Akin opposite Wendell Ramos and Angelika dela Cruz.

In 2009, Magalona joined the cast of SRO Cinemaserye: Ganti, opposite Marvin Agustin and Geoff Eigenmann.
Maxene also starred on Sine Novela: Kung Aagawin Mo ang Lahat sa Akin with JC Tiuseco, Glaiza de Castro and Patrick Garcia.

In June 2010, she joined the cast of Sine Novela: Trudis Liit, with her co-stars Pauleen Luna, Mike Tan, Gina Alajar, and new Kapuso child actress Jillian Ward. Then in February 2011, she starred on GMA afternoon drama show, My Lover, My Wife opposite Adrian Alandy and Kapuso Actress Nadine Samonte.

In 2013, Magalona joined the GMA afternoon drama series Mga Basang Sisiw playing Vicky Sta. Maria, the main antagonist role and villain of the series, with the lead stars Renz Valerio, Bianca Umali and Miko Zarsadias.

Return to ABS-CBN (2014–present)
In the 3rd quarter of 2014, she signed an exclusive contract and returned to her home network after 16 years, ABS-CBN. and since then had a guest stint as one of the Hurado's on It's Showtime; as a guest player in The Singing Bee; as a special guest in Kris TV; and starred in Maalaala Mo Kaya (Episode title: Nurse Cap), portraying the nurse rapper, Fatima Palma. Magalona's first major project as a Kapamilya Artist is being part of ABS-CBN's Primetime Soap Dream Dad together with Jana Casandra Agoncillo and Zanjoe Marudo.

In the first quarter of 2015, Magalona was one of the eight contestants of the first season of the Philippine edition of Your Face Sounds Familiar.

In November 2015, after 2 months of the pilot, Magalona joined the cast of Doble Kara as Alexandra "Alex" Acosta in season 2. She's a sweet and kind-hearted to the kids where she worked and she was raised by her older half-brother Sebastian "Seb" Acosta portrayed by Sam Milby. She met Kara Dela Rosa portrayed by Julia Montes (which Seb married Kara in season 4). At first, she likes Kara for her brother and keeps asking her brother to take Kara out. But, when she finds out that Kara's adopted mother Lucille Acosta-Dela Rosa portrayed by Carmina Villaroel was her half-sister from her father's side, the sweet and kind-hearted lady became evil to Kara and her family because she believes that Lucille's family is the reason why she grew without parents. Later on, she became the main antagonist of the series in season 4.

Personal life
In 2015, Magalona began dating musician Rob Mananquil. On February 14, 2017 (Valentine's Day), the two became engaged when the latter proposed to the former while vacationing in Tokyo. Magalona and Mananquil married on January 11, 2018, at a ceremony in Boracay. The two are currently based in the town of Ubud in Bali, Indonesia, where they are undergoing yoga teacher training. In October 2022, Magalona confirmed via her instagram posts that she was recently single and separated from Mananquil for months.

Filmography

Television

Drama series

Drama anthology

Comedy

Others

Movies

Awards and nominations

References

External links
 

1986 births
Living people
Star Magic
Maxene
Ateneo de Manila University alumni
Filipino expatriates in Indonesia
Filipino child actresses
Filipino film actresses
Filipino television actresses
Actresses from Manila
ABS-CBN personalities
GMA Network personalities
TV5 (Philippine TV network) personalities
Yoga teachers